Bal Bhavan Public School is a private school located in Mayur Vihar Ph II near DDA market Patparganj, Delhi-110091.

It currently has about 3000 students and is placed at 15th rank amongst the top Delhi Schools in Mayur Vihar.

History 
Bal Bhavan Public School was founded on 7 August 1967 by founder Chairman Late Sh. G.C. Lagan. The school is being run and managed by Lagan Kala Upvan (Regd.) Society.

About school 
The school is affiliated to Central Board of Secondary Education (CBSE). The school offers Science, Commerce and Humanities stream to the students of classes XI & XII.

All the classrooms are digitally enabled for better understanding of concepts. The school has a huge playground and offers cricket, basketball, football, volleyball, hockey, and athletics. The school playground is one of the finest available in the schools of East Delhi. The playground has an artificial synthetic turf to provide the pleasure of the sport. The school organises Shri. G.C. Lagan Memorial Athletic Tournament every year in the month of October or November.

Apart from sports, the school provides ample opportunities to its students to explore their hidden talents. The Dance and Music group of the school 'Pehchaan' composed a song 'Khushiyon wali Diwali' in October 2016 to aware general public about the poisonous effects of using fire crackers during Diwali. The song is available on YouTube. The Chief Minister of Delhi, Sh. Arvind Kejriwal appreciated the efforts of the students and teachers in a letter addressed to the Principal.

The school excels in academic result and has been producing extraordinary result in CBSE Class X & XII examination.

Achievements 
Founder Chairman, Late Shri G.C. Lagan was recipient of State Teachers Award 1994. He is also recipient of many National Awards conferred on him by various organisation for his selfless contribution in the field of education.
Principal, Sh. B.B. Gupta is a recipient of state Teachers Award 2006 and Best Teachers Award, CBSE 2011. Apart from this, he has been conferred with many reputed awards for his relentless efforts in the field of education.
The school has received BHAGIDARI AWARD from the Government of Delhi, conferred by then CM of Delhi, Smt. Shiela Dixit, for guiding young generation about environmental issues. The school is one of the LEAD ECO-CLUB school of Delhi.
The school has also received an award of appreciation from Delhi Traffic Police for sensitising students towards Road Safety.

References

External links 
 Bal Bhavan Public School
YouTube
Facebook

Schools in Delhi